The 1982 Roller Hockey World Cup was the twenty-fifth roller hockey world cup, organized by the Fédération Internationale de Roller Sports. It was contested by 22 national teams (9 from Europe, 5 from South America, 4 from North America, 2 from Oceania, 1 from Africa and 1 from Asia). All the games were played in the city of Barcelos, in Portugal, the chosen city to host the World Cup.

Group stage

Group A

Group B

Group C

Group D

Final phase

13th to 22nd play-off

Final-twelve

Standings

See also
FIRS Roller Hockey World Cup

External links
1982 World Cup in rink-hockey.net historical database

Roller Hockey World Cup
International roller hockey competitions hosted by Portugal
1982 in roller hockey
1982 in Portuguese sport